A portmanteau (plural portmanteaux or portmanteaus) was a traveling bag (suitcase style) used as a mailbag. During the eighteenth and nineteenth centuries, both newspapers and letters were transported in these leather mailbags that opened into two sections.

Etymology 
The etymology of the word is the Middle French porte-manteau, from porter, "to carry", and manteau, "coat, mantle". A court official carried the robes of a king in a portmanteau (traveling bag). The portmanteau had two hinged compartments and hence this idea of "two" carried over into early America.

History 
English merchant Thomas Witherings established mail routes throughout Europe in the 1620s. He drew up a proposition in 1635 for an English mail system based in London in which portmanteaux (containing 2 leather bags lined with cotton) could travel to European towns with sealed bags of mail for protection against spies. The system was put into motion and some 26,000 letters mailed safely unopened between London and European towns each week.

In the nineteenth century the official portmanteau was used to carry the mail (two items: letters and newspapers) on New England stagecoaches that traveled the post roads. Before 1789 newspapers were mostly excluded from the mail and the official portmanteau. After the 1st United States Congress (1789–1791) the postmaster general allowed printers free postage to communicate reports and articles of newspapers with other publishers in other towns and cities to distribute Congressional information. This came about because of complaints to Thomas Jefferson. Congressmen then mailed issues of Congressional newspapers to their home districts. The congressional privilege was expedited using a special signature or marking called franking which allowed this free postage for their newspapers and other mailings.

These Congressional newspapers allowed for a great number of newspapers accessible to local newspapers about news from Congress. The post rider's dependable official portmanteau delivery system could be used then which gave the newspapers a good chance of arriving. Before this the newspapers were carried outside the official portmanteau by the post riders and had a small chance of completing their journey.

The Postal Service Act of 1792 legally allowed Congressional newspapers into the mail system postage free: 
Despite this, postal officers often still did not allow newspapers to be carried in the official portmanteau with the regular mail. Where the mail was carried by post riders at the time, then the newspapers had to be light and able to fit in the saddlebag or else they were likely to be left behind because they would be too much of a load for the rider. Post riders carried official portmanteau horse leather saddlebags that carried the mail, that contained Congressional newspapers, on their horse's backside, which were locked and could only be opened by an authorized postal person. This procedure came about because of constant complaints of personal mail being previously opened before arrival. The letters and newspapers were divided into two separate canvas or linen bags and placed inside portmanteaux for distribution.

In the nineteenth century the portmanteau mailbag (French term: grand sac des malles) was used on the postal route from Fredericton, New Brunswick, to Amherstburg in Canada. The portmanteau mailbags were made of waterproof material such as a heavy leather. In some cases, the portmanteau mailbags were covered with tarpaulin cloth, India rubber and oilcloth to prevent water from entering.

The post office system was quite primitive in the beginning and had little organization. The mail was often carried from post office to post office in large portmanteau mailbags. The official portmanteau went from post office to post office and opened by the local postal official at his stop. The postal official then took out the mail that pertained to his local people (who came to the post office to collect their mail) and then passed it onto its next destination point, whose postal official did the same, until the end of the route. When the mail arrived at a local post office, the postal official would take the mail meant for his post office and pass on the rest of the mail without much care in handling. The portmanteau mailbag was then clumsily closed and sent to its next post office on route. In this haphazard handling of the portmanteau, mail would often get mutilated to the point where it was no longer readable. Sometimes mail was even lost on route. Due to the roads of the time being in less than desirable travel condition, mail was often delayed. The contractors and carriers took little care in handling the mail. On July 1 of 1836 the Postal Act of 1836 went into effect to improve mail delivery with the portmanteau mailbags.

See also 

 catcher pouch
 mail bag
 mail pouch
 mail sack
 mail satchel
 mochila

Bibliography

Footnotes

References

Sources

Further reading

External links 

Bags
Postal systems
Postal history